This is a list of extreme points of New England, which are points that extend farther north, south, east, or west than any other part of New England. There is also the highest point, lowest point, and geographic center.

See also

Extreme points of the United States

References

External links

Extreme points of the United States
New England
New England